The Clare Under-21 Hurling Championship is an annual Gaelic Athletic Association club competition between the under-21 Hurling clubs in Clare.

The current (2022) county champions are the amalgamation of Scariff-Ogonelloe who defeated reigning champions Corofin-Ruan by 2-17 to 1-12.

Roll of honour

List of finals

See also
 Clare Senior Hurling Championship
 Clare Intermediate Hurling Championship
 Clare Junior A Hurling Championship

1